"No Church in the Wild" is a song by American rappers Jay-Z and Kanye West featuring American singers Frank Ocean and The-Dream, from the former two's first collaborative album Watch the Throne (2011). Opening the album, the song explores themes of religion and decadence. The track received highly positive reviews from music critics, who praised Ocean's vocal hooks, the depth of the verses, the cinematic production and the song's power as an opening track.

The track was released as the seventh and final single from Watch the Throne. The song peaked at number 72 on the US Billboard Hot 100 and entered the top 40 on both the US Billboard Hot Rap Songs and Hot R&B/Hip-Hop Songs charts. The song received a music video directed by Romain Gavras released on May 29, 2012. The video features anarchic riot footage and large street fights. The video received positive reviews from critics who praised the visuals of the video and the unique aesthetic presented in the video. The video was shot in Prague, Czech Republic.

Jay-Z and West performed the song as part of the setlist of their Watch the Throne Tour and Ocean performed his portion of the song on several occasions during his November 2011 tour through North America and Europe. The song received a nomination for Best Original or Adapted Song at the 2013 Black Reel Awards, along with two nominations at the 55th Grammy Awards for Best Short Form Music Video and Best Rap/Sung Collaboration winning the latter.

Background
Jay-Z and Kanye West are close friends and American rappers who have collaborated on several tracks together, such as singles like "Swagga Like Us", "Run This Town", and "Monster". In 2010, they began production and recording on a collaborative record Watch the Throne. Frank Ocean is an R&B singer who released his debut mixtape Nostalgia, Ultra in early 2011 to critical acclaim. The release of the mixtape interested West, who was reported to be a big fan. West invited Ocean to write and sing on two songs on the record. Frank wrote and provided vocals on tracks "No Church in the Wild" and "Made in America" and the songs were recorded in New York. The production of the track was handled by 88-Keys and Kanye West.

88 Keys randomly visited West to say hello, and stumbled upon a Watch the Throne" session, in a room with Jay-Z, Q-Tip, No I.D. and engineer Noah Goldstein, 88-Keys played 20 of his beats that were catalogued on SoundCloud. "Everybody in the room just started going crazy," 88-Keys said. An hour later, they had singled out the beat that would become "No Church in the Wild." West  told 88-Keys what additions he wanted made, "add an extra kick drum on there... a heavier bass line and strings". The next day, 88-Keys met Frank Ocean for the first time and heard the chorus as well as an unreleased spoken word intro. Over the next few days, Jay-Z recorded his 16 bars and Kanye recorded an eight-bar verse. For a while, the song remained unfinished but was completed close to the album release.

88-Keys did not hear the final version until Jay-Z showcased it at the invite-only listening session at the Museum of Natural History's planetarium in August 2011. Record producer and singer The-Dream sings a verse on the track using Auto-Tune. The track impacted urban radio as the seventh and final single from Watch the Throne on March 20, 2012.

Composition

"No Church in the Wild" features a cinematic production style and serves as an "ominous opener." According to Billboard, Odd Future singer Frank Ocean and The-Dream lend their voices to the album's "grim opener," which sets the mood with a "gnarled guitar sample". It features a bass-heavy beat with guitar riffs, synthesizers, and drums. The song begins with Frank Ocean's chorus followed by a Jay-Z verse about various topics including philosophy, braggadocio and religion. On Ocean's chorus, Los Angeles Times writer Randall Roberts stated "with it the listener enters a bejeweled realm, one filled with musings on the spoils of riches and the chaos that accompanies it." The chorus "underpins Jay Z's contemplation of the relevance of the clergy and ancient philosophers to someone who makes his living on the streets, while R&B star Frank Ocean questions, "What is a God to a non-believer?"" The chorus then repeats and The-Dream performs a bridge, preceding West's verse where he boasts "You will not control the threesome." West's verse included references to Socrates, the perils of monogamy, "implied regicide" and both rappers "take turns describing a night of decadence that leaves blood on the coliseum walls." The song contains samples from "K Scope" as performed by Phil Manzanera, "Sunshine Help Me" as performed by Spooky Tooth and "Don't Tell a Lie About Me and I Won't Tell the Truth About You" as performed by James Brown. According to Alexis Petridis of The Guardian, the track utilizes "unlikely samples" with "Ocean's haunting vocal against Roxy Music's Phil Manzanera playing a tricksy prog riff."

Promotion
The track was performed by West and Jay on their Watch the Throne Tour. Ocean performed his hook of the song at some of the performances during his 2011 concert series through the United States and Europe. The song was used in the promotional advertising and the end credits for the film Safe House, the promo advertising for The Great Gatsby, and in an advertising series for the 2013 Dodge Dart automobile.

Music video
A music video was filmed in late April 2012 in the areas surrounding Prague's Jan Palach Square and National Theatre by the Greek-French director Romain Gavras. There were two hundred extras, divided into police and rioters. The final video was released on May 29, 2012. The video is "clearly influenced by the protests and civil unrest that took place all across the country."  The video's final shot bears similarity to an image from visual artist UnkleLuc's project, The Wild. Rolling Stone reported that the "clip for "No Church in the Wild" depicts a grim clash between a large number of protesters and heavily armed and violent riot police."

Nominations
"No Church in the Wild" received three nominations at the 2012 UK Music Video Awards; Best International Urban Video, Best Cinematography in a Video and Best Telecine in a Video

Credits
Director: Romain Gavras
Production Company: Somesuch & Co
Producer: Mourad Belkeddar
Line Producer: Charlotte Marmion
Director of Photography: Mattias Montero
Production Designer: Jan Houllevigue
Editor: Walter Mauriot
Stylist: Hannah Edwards
Colorist: Simon Bourne 
Local Production: Unit + Sofa

Reception
"No Church in the Wild" received mostly positive reviews from music critics and was often described as a highlight from Watch the Throne. Andy Gill of The Independent stated "the best track is surely the opener 'No Church in the Wild', whose deep, detuned twang groove, over a marching organ motif, is the most striking music on the album, promising rather more than the rest of the record is able to deliver. Both this and the other stand-out track, "Made In America", feature assured vocal refrains from Frank Ocean, while the two rappers muse over familiar themes of loyalty, sexuality and maternal solidarity." Rolling Stone claimed that it is one of the most musically impressive songs on Watch the Throne and described the production as an "ominous, darkly funky bass groove and chilly synths tailor-made for Ocean's off-kilter crooning." Matt Popkin from American Songwriter praised Jay-Z's needs jesus verse and the menacing vibe of the song. NOW claimed that the "uncomfortably visceral opener 'No Church In The Wild' – with its filthy Phil Manzanera guitar sample and mournful Frank Ocean chorus – cuts to the heart of Watch The Throne's power dynamic." However, PopMatters criticized that the verses "feel a little out of focus compared to the hook and beat's opulence." Sputnikmusic's Tyler Fisher commented "88-Keys creates a positively epic opening track with 'No Church in the Wild', full of creeping guitar riffs and pulsating bass, building tension that simply never releases." Rolling Stone named the track the sixth best song of the year, reporting that "with Hov and Yeezy getting deep into arcane theology, this track is just another high."

Dagbladet named it the 12th best song of 2011. In 2019  XXL named the song as one of the 25 best Hip-Hop album intro's since 2000.

Media usage
 The song was used in both the trailer, and a scene in the film, for the 2013 film The Great Gatsby.
 "No Church in the Wild" was featured in a UFC 189 promo for fight between Conor McGregor and José Aldo.
 The track was featured in the trailer and the film of the 2012 film Safe House.
 "No Church in the Wild" was used in an Audi Quattro commercial.
 The song is featured at the beginning of the "Out of Our Own" episode, part 1 of the BBC Silent Witness, series 18.
 "No Church in the Wild" appeared in a Dodge Dart (PF) advertisement entitled: How to Change Cars Forever, that featured American footballer Tom Brady
 A similar beat was used in the Malayalam film Comrade in America in the song "Kerala Manninayi". A credit was given to Kanye West and Jay-Z in the video of the song.

Credits and personnel
Produced by 88-Keys, Kanye West and Mike Dean
Frank Ocean and The-Dream's vocal production by Om'Mas Keith
Recorded by Noah Goldstein, Ken Lewis and Brent Kolatalo
Additional recording: Pat Thrall
Mixed by Mike Dean
Additional instruments: Ken Lewis
Additional vocals: The-Dream
Mixed and recorded at The Mercer Hotel

Charts and certifications

Weekly charts

Certifications

References

External links
 
 Full lyrics of this song at Rap Genius
 Recording on MusicBrainz

2011 songs
2012 singles
Jay-Z songs
Kanye West songs
Frank Ocean songs
Music videos directed by Romain Gavras
Song recordings produced by Kanye West
Songs written by Jay-Z
Songs written by Kanye West
Songs written by Frank Ocean
Songs written by The-Dream
Roc-A-Fella Records singles
Roc Nation singles
Def Jam Recordings singles
Grammy Award for Best Rap/Sung Collaboration
Songs written by Mike Dean (record producer)
Songs written by Phil Manzanera
Songs written by James Brown
Songs written by Gary Wright